Lik'ichiri (Aymara lik'i fat, grease, fatness -chiri a suffix, "fat remover", lik'ichiri a supernatural creature of the Andean cultures, hispanicized spelling Likhichiri, equivalent to pishtaco) is a mountain in the Andes of Bolivia in the Potosí Department, Tomás Frías Province, Potosí Municipality. It lies north of Potosí and the river Samasa and east of the village Tarapaya.

References 

Mountains of Potosí Department